The Legionnaires is a 1968 documentary novel by Swedish author Per Olov Enquist about the Swedish extradition of Baltic soldiers shortly after the Second World War. It won the Nordic Council Literature Prize in 1969.

References

1968 Swedish novels
Novels set in the 1940s
Swedish-language novels
Nordic Council's Literature Prize-winning works